The Qatar Athletics Federation is the governing body for the sport of athletics in Qatar. It is a member of the Arab Athletics Federation, Asian Athletics Association and World Athletics. The president of the body is Dr. Thani bin Abdulrahman Al Kuwari.

The Federation is currently based at the Al Hodaifi Tower in Doha, the same location as the Qatar Olympic Committee.

References

External links
Official website

Qatar
Athletics in Qatar
Athletics
National governing bodies for athletics